Baguley tram stop is a tram stop on the Airport Line, built for phase 3B of the Manchester Metrolink to Manchester Airport. It opened on 3 November 2014 and is on Southmoor Road next to Roundthorn Industrial Estate and a Tesco supermarket.

It is proposed to link with a proposed station in a future Northern line from Altrincham to Stockport.

Services

Metrolink
Trams run every 12 minutes north to Victoria and south to Manchester Airport. Between 03:00 and 06:00, a service operates between Deansgate-Castlefield and Manchester Airport every 20 minutes.

Metrolink ticket zones 
Baguley is located in Metrolink ticket zone 3.

Proposed Rail services
Trains are scheduled to run along the Stockport-Altrincham line between Manchester Piccadilly station and Chester, where trains currently run every hour in the off-peak period.  However, additional trains are proposed between Greenbank and Stockport which could give Baguley 4 trains per hour.

References

External links

 Metrolink stop information
 Baguley area map
 Light Rail Transit Association
 Airport route map

Tram stops in Manchester
Railway stations in Great Britain opened in 2014
2014 establishments in England